The Detective 2 is a 2011 Hong Kong thriller film directed by Oxide Pang and starring Aaron Kwok. It is the sequel to 2007's The Detective. The film was followed by a sequel, Conspirators, released in 2013.

Synopsis

Bumbling private detective Chan Tam (Aaron Kwok) is enlisted by police pal Fung Chak (Liu Kai-chi) to help in the investigation of a serial murder case. The victims – a middle-aged man killed at home, a dead woman found in the trash dump, and a teenage girl slain in the park – were all killed in grisly manners, but they didn't seem related to each other. Without any clue to follow up on, Tam is decidedly at his wits' end. But when Chak is seriously wounded by a mysterious assailant, Tam deduces that the only way to uncover the truth is to get into the mind of the deranged killer, and in so doing he is forced to face a long-hidden side of himself.

Cast
 Aaron Kwok as Tam
 Liu Kai-chi as Inspector Fung Chak 
 Patrick Tam as Inspector Lo
 Cheung Siu-fai as Leung Wai Yip
 Gong Beibi as Ling Ho-yee
 Izz Xu as Ling Ka-fai

Release
The film was released in Hong Kong on 12 May 2011.

References

External links
 
 

2011 films
2011 crime thriller films
Hong Kong crime thriller films
Hong Kong detective films
Films directed by Oxide Pang
2010s Cantonese-language films
Hong Kong sequel films
Films set in Bangkok
Films shot in Bangkok
2010s Hong Kong films